Alakamisy is a town in Fianarantsoa Province in central Madagascar.

Geography
Nearby towns include Ambohimirana, Andoharano, Andranoraikitra, Antsahamalaza, Fandrianakely, Morarano, Tsarazaza and Vohibolo.

Economy
There is a mine in the vicinity of the town named the Alakamisy Itenina Mine. The mine is worked in alluvium and was discovered in 1989 in a rice plantation.

References

Populated places in Fianarantsoa Province